Isoperla montana is a species in the subfamily Isoperlinae ("green-winged stoneflies"), in the order Plecoptera ("stoneflies"). The species is known generally as the "montane stripetail".
It is found in North America.

References

Further reading
 Arnett, Ross H. (2000). American Insects: A Handbook of the Insects of America North of Mexico. CRC Press.

Perlodidae